Jade Flask (born 4 August 1996) is a Maltese footballer who plays as a midfielder and has appeared for the Malta women's national team.

Career
Flask has been capped for the Malta national team, appearing for the team during the 2019 FIFA Women's World Cup qualifying cycle.

References

External links
 
 
 

1996 births
Living people
Maltese women's footballers
Malta women's international footballers
Women's association football midfielders